For information on all University of Cincinnati sports, see Cincinnati Bearcats

The Cincinnati Bearcats men's soccer team represented the University of Cincinnati in all NCAA Division I men's college soccer competitions. Cincinnati previously competed in various conferences including the American Athletic Conference, Big East Conference, Conference USA, the Great Midwest Conference and the Big Central Soccer Conference. The Bearcats played their home fixtures at Gettler Stadium on the University of Cincinnati campus in Cincinnati, Ohio. Cincinnati was most recently coached by Hylton Dayes, a former player who had coached the Bearcats since 2001.

The University of Cincinnati Department of Athletics discontinued its men's soccer program effective immediately, Director of Athletics John Cunningham announced on April 14, 2020.

The men's soccer program dated to 1973 with an all-time record of 385–408–84. The Bearcats were 5–11–1 in 2019 and longtime head coach Hylton Dayes stepped down following the season.

Seasons 
The following is a list of Cincinnati's records since forming in 1982.

NCAA tournament results 
Cincinnati has appeared in three NCAA Tournaments. They have a combined record of 0–2–1.

References

External links 
 

 
1982 establishments in Ohio
2020 disestablishments in Ohio